Combretum quadrangulare is a small tree of the family Combretaceae, up to 10 m high. The tree grows wildly or is planted in Vietnam, Cambodia, Laos, Myanmar and Thailand.

The tree is planted along the banks of rivers or arroyos for firing. It is found throughout Thailand especially in open, wet places. Therapeutic uses of this plant in the country are for anthelmintics (the parts used were seeds, roots and leaves) and curing venereal disease (the parts used are roots and wood). Studies of the chemical constituents of this plant have revealed that alcoholic and other extracts from the roots and seeds could kill earthworms. Extracts from seeds display antibacterial properties.

Description 
Tree, 5-10m high: young branchlets acutely quad-rangular or very narrowly quadrialate. Leaves simple, opposite, elliptic or obovate, 3–8 cm wide, 6–16 cm long: petiole acutely ridged. Inflorescence in terminal and axillary spike; flower small, yellowish white. Fruit dry, thinly quadrialate: seed brownish red, ellipsoid, 4- angled.

Seed: anthelmintic for roundworm, threadworm

Root: treatment of venereal diseases: anthelminithic

Leaf: relieves muscular pain

Chemistry 
Combretol is an O-methylated flavonol, found in C. quadrangulare. The plant also contains the gallic acid derivative, 1-O-galloyl-6-O-(4-hydroxy-3,5-dimethoxy)benzoyl-beta-D-glucose.

References

quadrangulare